This list of the largest evangelical megachurches contains only evangelical Christian megachurches related to the following currents: Baptist, Pentecostalism, the evangelical charismatic movement, neo-charismatic movement and Nondenominational Christianity, in a single place, and not the assistance of affiliated campuses. Large churches from other denominations, like Catholicism, are not included as they are not deemed to belong to the megachurch phenomenon which by definition is part of Protestantism. The list is not exhaustive, there are large annual changes, and there are difficulties to compare the churches as different methods to count can be used.

Characteristics
The term megachurch is used for churches with regular attendance of 2,000 people. When it has more than 10,000 people who gather together, the term gigachurch is sometimes used.

Research institutes

Annual publications
Church Growth Today is a research center which publishes annually lists of evangelical Christian megachurches in USA and the world.

Lifeway research is a research center which publishes annually a list of evangelical Christian megachurches in USA.

Directories
The Leadership Network contains a directory of all Christian megachurches  of the world (excluding Canada and USA). This global list has over 270 megachurches. The Hartford Institute has compiled directories in Canada and the USA. The US list has more than 1,668 megachurches and the Canadian list 22.

Data accuracy
The numbers reported are not accurate by any means, as attendance and membership may be defined very differently. Attendance may include people that are not legally members of the church, not baptised, non-believers, children, and may even belong to other churches. Some churches include their, sometimes loosely, affiliated churches in other places and even people that attend by electronic media. As many have several services on one day, there may be some overlap, with people attending more than one service. The exact number of people is seldom counted , thus estimation errors can occur. There is an obvious psychological boost from reporting growing numbers, "success", for enhanced credibility and motivation to support the work. The megachurches may quite be different from traditional evangelical congregations where clear membership records are maintained, to define who has legal right to vote in the church assembly, who can be appointed to public offices and who belongs to the flock under direct pastoral care, and the pastor can often be replaced. The megachurches are often formed around a strong leader that stays in charge for decades, it is often like his "own personal enterprise", many times with limited economic transparency, a tendency that has been questioned in various countries. In notable cases the headship has been passed on from father to son, like in Lakewood Church. Many megachurches have had an affiliation to a denomination, but have become independent, thus outside the denominational supervision that is common for non-independent congregations. Thus, in cases of irregularities, a pastor may continue without disciplinary measures, due to their sheer power, and any disappointed members may leave but new people keep coming in, with reduced effect on attendance.

Hence, due to inaccuracies, the same church can sometimes be reported to have attendance and membership counts that differ 5-10 times, depending on how reporting is done and who is doing it, e.g. Yoido Full Gospel Church can sometimes be mentioned with attendance numbers over 800,000.

List
The list below is of the largest Evangelical megachurches with weekly attendance of more than 30,000 people.

See also 

 List of the largest evangelical church auditoriums
 List of megachurches in the United States
 Worship service (evangelicalism)

References

Citations

Sources 

 Content on this page has been translated from the existing French Wikipedia article at :fr:Liste de megachurches évangéliques; see its history for attribution.

Further reading 
 Sébastien Fath. Dieu XXL, la révolution des mégachurches. France: Édition Autrement, 2008.

Megachurches